Dentalium may refer to:

 Dentalium (genus), a genus of tooth shells
 Dentalium (anthropology), tusk shells used in indigenous jewelry and commerce in North America